Club Atlético Delfines de Coatzacoalcos, A.C. is a team of football from the city of Coatzacoalcos, that is in the Tercera División de México.

History
The team was founded in 1997 and they first appeared in Segunda División de México. They lasted six seasons until they were crowned champions in the Clausura 2003 and eventually won the final for promotion to the Primera Division 'A' against Coras Tepic. The team had good performances in the Second Division, but in the Clausura 2004 were relegated.

They achieved promotion again in 2005 after winning the final of the Segunda División de México against Pumas Naucalpan by a score of 5–4 on penalties. In regulation time the match ended 4–4 in aggregate after the first match held in Coatzacoalcos, the Delfines won 2–1; while in the second match they lost 3–2 to Pumas Naucalpan.

Their history in the Primera Division 'A' finished in 2006 when the franchise was sold to make way for the Guerreros de Tabasco.

In 2013 another team ended up setting up in the same area with the same name. Club de Fútbol Delfines Atlético Coatzacoalcos managed to win the Segunda Division de Mexico in 2014 and promotion to Ascenso MX. Atlético Delfines de Coatzacoalcos managed to be promoted to the Liga de Ascenso MX after winning the final against Linces de Tlaxcala, but were unable meet the standards by the Mexican Federation of Football and was replaced by Tepic.

Honors

National Tournaments
Diego Olsina (Goal scoring Champion Ascenso MX): Clausura 2006,  15 goals

Segunda División de Mexico (2): Clausura 2003, Apertura 2005

Footnotes

Football clubs in Veracruz
Ascenso MX teams

Atlético Delfines de Coatzacoalcos